André-Elzéard d'Arbaud II de Jouques (1737-1793) was a French aristocrat, lawyer and public official.

Biography

Early life
André-Elzéard d'Arbaud II was born in 1737. His father was Jean-Joseph-Augustin d'Arbaud de Jouques (unknown-1768) and his mother, Françoise-Lucrèce-Cécile de Renaud. He had a brother, Joseph Bache d'Arbaud (1738-1812), and a sister, Anne Constance d'Arbaud (unknown-1789). He was named after his paternal grandfather, André-Elzéard d'Arbaud de Jouques (1676-1744).

Career
He inherited the marquisates of Jouques and Mison as well as the baronetcy of Ongles.

He served as Président à mortier of the Parliament of Aix-en-Provence in 1768.

Personal life
He was married to Gabrielle-Thérèse de Milan-Forbin, daughter of Joseph Charles Bernard Ignace de Milan de Forbin de La Roque and Marie Marthe de Bertet. They had three children:
Joseph Charles André d'Arbaud de Jouques (1769–1849).
Bache-Philippe Augustin d'Arbaud de Jouques.
Melchior-Elzéard-André d’Arbaud de Jouques.

He was guillotined by revolutionaries on December 26, 1793, in Lyon due to his support of the King.

References

1737 births
1793 deaths
People from Aix-en-Provence
Provencal nobility
French people executed by guillotine during the French Revolution